Friðrik  is a masculine Icelandic given name. Notable people with the name include:

Friðrik Þór Friðriksson (born 1953), Icelandic film director
Friðrik Ólafsson (born 1935), Icelandic chess Grandmaster and former president of FIDE
Friðrik Ómar (born 1981), Icelandic singer, who represented Iceland in the Eurovision Song Contest 2008
Friðrik Sophusson (born 1943), Icelandic politician, director of Icelandic state-run energy firm Landsvirkjun
 Friðrik Dór (born 1988), Icelandic singer and songwriter

Icelandic masculine given names